Solidago lepida, the western Canada goldenrod or western goldenrod, is a North American plant species in the genus Solidago of the family Asteraceae. It is widespread across much of Canada, the western United States, and northern Mexico.

Description
Solidago lepida  is a perennial herb up to 150 cm (5 feet) tall, spreading by means of underground rhizomes. Leaves have coarse teeth and are on the stem rather than at the base. One plant can sometimes produce as many as 800 small flower heads, each with 7-22 ray florets surrounding 2-13 disc florets.

Varieties
Solidago lepida subsp. fallax (Fernald) Semple - Labrador, Newfoundland, Québec, New Brunswick
Solidago lepida var. lepida - from Alaska east to Northwest Territories and south to California, Arizona, New Mexico, Chihuahua
Solidago lepida var. salebrosa (Piper) Semple - Rocky Mountains from Alberta + British Columbia south to New Mexico, Arizona and Baja California

References

External links

lepida
Plants described in 1836
Flora of Subarctic America
Flora of Canada
Flora of the Northwestern United States
Flora of the Southwestern United States
Flora of the South-Central United States
Flora without expected TNC conservation status